Chanovice is a municipality and village in Klatovy District in the Plzeň Region of the Czech Republic. It has about 800 inhabitants. The historic centre of Chanovice is well preserved and protected by law as a village monument zone.

Administrative parts
Villages of Černice, Defurovy Lažany, Dobrotice, Holkovice and Újezd u Chanovic are administrative parts of Chanovice.

Gallery

References

Villages in Klatovy District